= Miramichi Opera House =

Coordinates: 46.9981°N 65.5686°W

The Miramichi Opera House was a century-old landmark situated at 159 Pleasant Street, Miramichi, New Brunswick that was destroyed by fire during the afternoon of January 2, 2010.

The Miramichi Opera House featured Romanesque Revival style structure and was built in 1903 by H.B. McDonald, according to the Canada's Historic Places website. In 1909, the Opera House became a 'moving pictures' theatre. Many decades later, the Opera House was turned into a successful nightclub by Larry foran .Then developed by next owner David Morris to a destination status.Following the death of Mr. Morris, the Opera House, said to contain a great deal of entertainment and movie memorabilia was then purchased by Francois Haché.

Heritage Value:

The heritage value of the Opera House was in association with its architect and builder, H.B. McDonald and his father John McDonald, respectively. As a young man, H.B. trained in the offices of Saint John architect R.C. John Dunn. His father, John McDonald, was a prominent local builder and sash and door factory owner. The construction of many public buildings, grand homes and businesses near the turn of the century, in Miramichi, New Brunswick, can be accredited to John McDonald.

Some of the structure's key elements that define its heritage character include:

- Continuous sandstone course lintel on front elevation.
- Brick cornice work and brick arch work over windows.
- Brick basket weave running course between first and second levels.
